The 2015 Commonwealth Youth Games, officially known as the V Commonwealth Youth Games, and commonly known as Samoa 2015, was the fifth Commonwealth Youth Games which started in the year 2000. It was held from 5 to 11 September, 2015 in Apia, the capital of Samoa. Samoa were the only bidders for the Games.

All events took place in the capital city, Apia. The opening and closing ceremonies were held in Apia Park, which also hosted the athletics, rugby and tennis competitions. All other events (boxing, swimming, squash, weightlifting and lawn bowls) were hosted in the Faleata Sports Complex.

About a thousand athletes from 63 nations and territories participated in the nine sports: aquatics, archery, athletics, boxing, lawn bowls, rugby sevens, squash, tennis and weightlifting. Sierra Leone's delegation of seven athletes were prevented from taking part, as the Samoan government refused to grant them visas, citing fears over the spread of ebola. The Commonwealth Games Federation appealed unsuccessfully to Samoan Prime Minister Tuilaepa Aiono Sailele Malielegaoi to reverse that decision, but also rejected Ghana's request that Samoa be subjected to sanctions as a result.

Sports

The 2015 programme featured nine sports, two more than the previous Games and matching that of the 2008 edition. Of the sports on the 2011 programme, badminton, cycling and gymnastics were dropped.

Medal table

As of September 11, 2015 (information from official website)

References

External links 

Official website
 http://samoa2015.thecgf.com

 
Samoa and the Commonwealth of Nations
2015
Commonwealth Youth Games
Commonwealth Youth Games
Youth sport in Samoa
Multi-sport events in Samoa
International sports competitions hosted by Samoa
2015 in youth sport
21st century in Apia